Barnes Ratwatte (known as Barnes Ratwatte Dissawa ) (1883 – 20 September 1957) was a Ceylonese colonial-era legislator and a headman. He was a member of the State Council and the Senate of Ceylon. He was appointed to the posts of Rate Mahatmaya of Balangoda and Dissawa by the British. He was the father of Sirimavo Bandaranaike, the first female Prime Minister in the world.

Early life
Born to the Ratwatte family, which was an old Radala family hailing from the Kingdom of Kandy, who were courtiers in the courts of Nayakkar monarchs, and one, Ratwatte, Dissawa of Matale was a signatory of to the Kandyan Convention. His father was Abeyratne Banda Ratwatte, Basnayake Nilame of the Maha Vishnu Devale and Shroff of the Mercantile Bank of India in Kandy and mother Thalgahagoda Lewke Punchi Kumarihamy, daughter of Thalgahagoda Rate Mahatmaya of Matale. He had two brothers Sir Cuda Ratwatte Adigar  who served as Mayor of Kandy and Harris Leuke Ratwatte who was former Diyawadana Nilame of Sri Dalada Maligawa, Kandy.

Educated at Trinity College, Kandy; Ratwatte married Rosalind Mahawelatenne Kumarihamy, daughter of Mahawalatenne Rate Mahatmaya of Balangoda. Married under the Binna marriage tradition of the Kandyan law, Ratwatte became the executor of his wife's properties inherited from his father-in-law and also succeeded his father-in-law's government post of Rate Mahatmaya of Balangoda.

Career
He was later given the title of Dissawa by the British Governor of Ceylon. He was elected as member of the State Council for Kegalle form 1936 to 1947 was elected Member of Parliament for Mawanella from the United National Party from 1947 to 1952.

Family
Barnes Ratwatte and his wife who was known as Ratwatte Kumarihamy had six children including four sons Barnes Ratwatte II, Dr Seevali Ratwatte, Dr Mackie Ratwatte and Clifford Ratwatte, former Member of Parliament for Balangoda and Chairman of the State Plantations and Sri Lanka Tea Board. Of their two daughters; the eldest Sirimavo Ratwatte was married to Solomon West Ridgeway Dias Bandaranaike, son of Sir Solomon Dias Bandaranaike, the Maha Mudaliyar (chief native interpreter and advisor to the Governor), who became the third Prime Minister of Ceylon. The youngest daughter, Patsy Ratwatte was married to Colonel Edward James Divitotawela, who founded the Central Command of the Ceylon Army. His grand daughter Chandrika Kumaratunga was President of Sri Lanka and his grandson Anura Bandaranaike, was a former speaker and cabinet minister.

See also
List of political families in Sri Lanka

External links & References
 The Ratwatte Ancestry

1883 births 
1957 deaths
Sri Lankan Buddhists
Dissava
Alumni of Trinity College, Kandy
Members of the 2nd State Council of Ceylon
Members of the Senate of Ceylon
Bandaranaike family
Barnes
Sinhalese politicians